Graham Strange (born 24 July 1968 in England) is a Bermudian cricketer. He is a right-handed batsman and a right-arm fast bowler. He has played one first-class match for Bermuda to date, against Canada in the 2005 ICC Intercontinental Cup.

References

External links
 Cricket Archive profile
 Cricinfo profile

1968 births
Bermudian cricketers
Living people